Squantum is a neighborhood in Quincy, Massachusetts.

Squantam may also refer to:
 Squantam NAS, an active naval aviation facility
 Squantum Point Park, a park
 Squantum Victory Yard, a former United States Naval Shipbuilding yard
 Squantum Association, a private club
 Squantum Yacht Club, a yacht club